National symbols of Belgium are the symbols used to represent the Kingdom of Belgium. Article 193 of the Belgian Constitution is dedicated to specifying the national flag, colours, coat of arms, and motto. It says the following: "The Belgian nation takes red, yellow and black as colours, and as state coat of arms the Belgian lion with the motto Unity makes strength."

National day 
The national holiday of Belgium, Belgian National Day, is commemorated annually on 21 July, but even though it is official, it is usually not considered a national symbol. The Flemish holiday is celebrated on 11 July, the Walloon holiday is celebrated on the third Sunday in September, the French-speaking Community's holiday is celebrated on 27 September, the German-speaking Community's holiday is celebrated on 5 November and the Brussels holiday is celebrated on 8 May.

List of official national symbols

List of official symbols of the Belgian communities and regions

Unofficial symbols 

The lion, especially the Leo Belgicus (Latin for "Belgian Lion") has been used as a heraldic animal to represent the Benelux for centuries. A heraldic lion can be seen on the Belgian coat of arms and can be seen as the countries de facto national animal. Moules-frites is often considered the unofficial national dish of Belgium. The red poppy (papaver rhoeas) is often considered the national unofficial national flower of Belgium. Other symbols of Belgium might include Manneken Pis, the Atomium, Belgian waffles, and Belgian fries, which were invented in Belgium.

See also 

 Belgian heraldry
 Coats of arms of Belgium
 Leo Belgicus

References